Mpofu is a surname found in Southern Africa mainly in Zimbabwe and South Africa.

Mpofu is an African surname that may refer to:

Christopher Mpofu (born 1985), Zimbabwean cricketer
Dali Mpofu (born 1962), South African lawyer and politician 
Elizabeth Mpofu (born 1959), Zimbabwean farmer and activist
Mpumi Mpofu, South African Secretary of Defence
Nkosana Mpofu (born 1988), Creative 
Obert Mpofu, Zimbabwean politician
Sizwe Mpofu-Walsh (born 1989), South African author, musician, activist and son of Dali Mpofu
Tafadzwa Mpofu (born 1985), Zimbabwean cricketer

Lunathi Mpofu, South African actress 

Oris Mpofu, South African actor
Zimbabwean surnames